Cóll  is a village in the province of Lleida, in Catalonia, Spain.  It lies in the valley and municipality of Vall de Boí in the comarca of Alta Ribagorça, at an altitude of 1,180 m.

Romanesque church 

The Romanesque church of Santa Maria dates from the 12th century.  It has a nave with barrel vaulting, and a bell tower.

External links 

Populated places in Alta Ribagorça
Vall de Boí